Yo soy tu padre ("I am Your Father") is a 1927 Mexican silent film. It features Sara García as an extra.

External links
 

1927 films
Mexican silent films
Mexican black-and-white films